KCNY (107.1 FM, My Country 107.1) is a radio station broadcasting a country music format. Licensed to Greenbrier, Arkansas, United States. The station is currently owned by Crain Media Group, LLC.

History
On December 12, 2002, the station was sold to Caldwell Broadcasting and on January 21, 2004, the station was sold to Crain Media Group.

References

External links
 
 

Country radio stations in the United States
CNY
Radio stations established in 2002
2002 establishments in Arkansas